Hind or Hinde was launched at Hull in 1800. After a voyage to Russia she made one voyage for the British East India Company. She then became a West Indiaman. She was wrecked in April 1815.

Career
Hind, of Hull, entered Lloyd's Register in 1800 with a burthen of 305 tons, Farthing, master, Foster, owner, and trade Hull—Archangel. In the 1801 edition her burthen was 385 tons, and her owner M. Foster. The other information was the same.

EIC voyage: Captain William Cattin (or Caitline) sailed from the Downs on 8 January 1801, bound for Bengal. William Catline tendered her to the EIC to bring back rice from Bengal. She was one of 28 vessels that sailed on that mission between December 1800 and February 1801.

 

Hind arrived at Calcutta on 24 June. Homeward bound, she was at Culpee on 5 September, reached Saint Helena on 31 December, and arrived at the Downs on 23 February 1802.

Lloyd's Register for 1802 made no mention of the voyage to India. It showed Hinds master changing from M. Farthing to E.Darby, her owner from Foster to Crosbie & Co., and her trade from Hull—Archangel to London—Jamaica. However, the Register of Shipping for 1802, which published earlier in the year than Lloyd's Register, showed HInds master changing from Caitling to E. Darby, her owner from Foster to Crosby, and her trade from London—India to London—Jamaica.

Fate
The Register of Shipping volume for 1815 shows Hind, of 384 tons (bm), launched at Hull in 1800, with J. Johns, master and owner, and trade London–Surinam.

Hind, Johns, master, from Surinam, was surveyed there and found unseaworthy. Still, Johns decided to sail on to England, possibly after repairs. On 14 April 1815 Hind, Johns, master, from Surinam to London, ran on shore in the back of the Goodwin Sands. She was totally lost but her master and crew landed at Margate. Only four bales of cotton and 90 bags of coffee were saved.

Notes, citations, and references
Notes

Citations

References
 
 

1800 ships
Ships of the British East India Company
Age of Sail merchant ships of England
Maritime incidents in 1815